Arina Alekseyevna Averina (born 13 August 1998) is a Russian individual rhythmic gymnast. She is a 2020 Summer Olympics finalist, a two-time (2017, 2019) world all-around silver medalist, a two-time European all-around champion (2018, 2021) and the 2016 Grand Prix Final all-around bronze medalist. She is a three-time (2019-2021) Russian national all-around champion and a three-time (2015, 2017, 2022) Russian national all-around medalist. Her identical twin sister Dina Averina is also a competitive rhythmic gymnast.

Personal life 
Arina Averina was born to Ksenia Averina and her husband Alexey Averin on August 13, 1998, twenty minutes before her identical twin sister Dina. Their sister, Polina, is three years older. The twins began gymnastic training at the age of four. Arina‘s mole on her right cheekbone near her ear is slightly higher than her sister Dina’s. A scar above Arina‘s right eye is the result of an accident with a club. Arina and Dina share the same instagram account.

On 18 March 2022 Averina, as well as her sister, participated in the Moscow rally in support of the Russian invasion of Ukraine.

Career

Junior
The Averina twins trained under their first coach Larisa Belova until they became members of the Russian national team. They then trained in the Olympic Training Center in Moscow, where they are now coached by Vera Shatalina.

The Averinas began appearing in international competitions in 2011. They competed at the 2011 Russian-Chinese Youth Games, where Arina finished 5th in the all-around and Dina  won the all-around gold medal. In 2012, Arina finished 11th at the Russian Junior Championships. Arina and Dina both competed at the Venera Cup in Eilat, Israel where Arina won bronze in the all-around; she also took silver in hoop and bronze medals in ball, clubs, and ribbon. At the International MTM Cup in Ljubljana (with teammates Aleksandra Soldatova and Dina), she won the Team gold medal.

In 2013, Arina finished 5th at the 2013 Russian Junior Championships. She competed in the Junior division at the Happy Caravan Cup in Tashkent and won Team gold with Dina Averina. At the 2013 Russian Spartakiada's 6th Summer Student Games, Arina won the all-around silver medal.

Senior

2014 
In 2014 Season, Arina debuted at the 2014 Moscow Grand Prix competing in the senior international tournament division where she won the all-around silver medal behind her twin sister Dina . Arina then competed at the 2014 Grand Prix Holon international tournament and won the all-around gold. Her next competition was at the 2014 Baltic Hoop where she won the all-around silver behind Aleksandra Soldatova. In the event finals: she won gold in ball, 2 silver medals (clubs, ribbon) and bronze in hoop. On April 23–27, Arina competed in senior nationals at the 2014 Russian Championships where she finished 7th in the all-around.

2015 
In 2015 season, Arina started her season at the 2015 Moscow Grand Prix. she then competed at the Corbeil-Essonnes International Rhythmic Gymnastics Tournament where she won the all-around gold medal ahead of twin sister Dina Averina, she won gold in all 4 of the event finals (hoop, ball, clubs, ribbon). On August 7–9, Arina competed at the MTK Budapest placing 3rd in the all-around behind Maria Titova. In apparatus finals, she won a silver in ball and bronze in hoop. Arina then took the silver medal in the all-around at the 2015 Dundee International Tournament in Sofia, behind her twin sister Dina.

2016 
In 2016, Arina began her season competing at the 2016 Grand Prix Moscow taking third place in the all-around, in apparatus finals: she won gold in ribbon and silver in clubs. On March 17–20, Arina then competed at the 2016 Lisboa World Cup where she finished 5th in the all-around with a total of 70.400 points, she qualified 2 event finals taking silver in ribbon (tied with teammate Aleksandra Soldatova) and placed 4th in ball. At the 30th Thiais Grand Prix event in Paris, Arina finished 5th in the all-around and qualified 2 apparatus finals finishing 4th in clubs and ribbon. Arina finished 4th in the all-around at the 2016 Russian Championships held in Sochi. On May 6–8, Arina competed at the Brno Grand Prix where she finished 5th in the all-around behind Victoria Veinberg Filanovsky. On May 13–15, Arina won the all-around silver at the Bucharest Grand Prix with a total of 73.600 points, she qualified to all apparatus finals: taking silver in ball, bronze in clubs, ribbon and 4th in hoop. On May 27–29, Arina finished 4th in the all-around at the 2016 Sofia World Cup with a total of 73.450 points, she qualified to all apparatus finals and won bronze in hoop, clubs, placed 4th in ball, 7th in ribbon. On July 1–3, Arina competed at the 2016 Berlin World Cup however, she withdrew after the first day of qualifications because she suffered a hand injury. On September 22–24, Arina competed at the 2016 Grand Prix Final in Eilat, Israel where she won the all-around bronze medal with a total of 73.916 points, she qualified in 2 apparatus finals taking silver medals in hoop and ribbon.

2017 
In 2017, Arina's season began in competition at the 2017 Grand Prix Moscow where she won the all-around bronze medal, she qualified to 1 apparatus final winning the silver medal in ribbon behind her twin sister Dina. Arina then participated in the organized Desio-Italia Trophy where she won silver in the all-around and team gold medal (together with Twin Sister Dina). On March 10–12, Arina won the all-around bronze medal at the 2017 Russian Championships behind Aleksandra Soldatova. On March 31 - April 2, Arina competed at the 2017 Grand Prix Marbella where she won silver in the all-around, she won 2 bronze medals in the ball and clubs. On April 21–23, Arina competed in her first World Cup of the season at the 2017 Tashkent World Cup where she won silver in the all-around behind Dina Averina, she qualified 3 apparatus finals winning gold in hoop, ball and ribbon. Her next event was at the 2017 Baku World Cup where she won her first gold medal in the all-around, she qualified to all apparatus finals taking gold in hoop, silver medals in ball, ribbon and bronze in clubs. On May 19–21, at the 2017 European Championships in Budapest, Hungary, Arina was member of the Golden winning Russian Team (together with senior individuals: twin sister Dina Averina, Aleksandra Soldatova and the junior group) scoring a total of 182.175 points which was more than 11 points ahead of their nearest competitor team Belarus. Arina qualified to 2 apparatus finals taking the gold medals in ball and clubs. On June 23–26, Arina then competed at the 2017 Holon Grand Prix taking gold in the all-around ahead of sister Dina, she qualified two apparatus finals winning gold in ribbon and silver in ball. At the quadrennial 2017 World Games which was held in Wrocław, Poland from July 20–30, Arina won 3 gold medals in hoop, ball, ribbon and a bronze medal in clubs. On August 11–13, Arina competed at the 2017 Kazan World Challenge Cup and won silver in the all-around behind Dina, she qualified in all the apparatus finals and won 2 gold medals in ball, ribbon and 2 silver medals in hoop, clubs. At the 2017 World Championships held on August 30 - September 3 in Pesaro, Italy, in the first day of the apparatus finals; Arina won gold in ball (18.950) and silver in hoop (19.000). The following day, she won another gold in ribbon (18.300) and bronze in clubs (17.800). During the individual all-around finals, she accumulated scores in (hoop:18.150, ball:18.500, clubs:18.550, ribbon:18.250) scoring a total of 73.450 points to win the silver medal behind twin sister Dina Averina.

2018 
In 2018, recovering from an off season injury, Arina's season began in competition at the 2018 Grand Prix Moscow where she won the all-around silver medal, she qualified to 3 apparatus finals but withdrew due to a hand injury. She participated at the 2018 Russian Championships, but later withdrew after one apparatus.

On March 24–25, Arina returned to competition at the 2018 Grand Prix Thiais where she finished 5th in all-around competition after big mistakes with ball. She qualified to two apparatus finals winning gold with clubs and silver with hoop. On April 13–15, she then competed at the 2018 Pesaro World Cup where she placed 4th in the all-around behind Linoy Ashram. She qualified to 3 apparatus finals and won gold with hoop, bronze with ribbon and placed 4th with clubs. On May 4–6, Arina's next event was 2018 Guadalajara World Challenge Cup where she won bronze in the all-around, she qualified to 3 apparatus finals winning gold with hoop and clubs and bronze with ribbon. On May 16–17, Arina competed at the 2018 Holon Grand Prix and won the all-around gold medal with a total of 76.700 points ahead of teammate Aleksandra Soldatova, she qualified in all apparatus finals. Arina won gold in hoop and silver in ball, in her last two events: she dropped her clubs twice putting her in 6th place and had imprecision with executions with ribbon placing her in 5th.

2019 
In 2019, she became the silver medalist in the all-around at the stage of the Grand Prix in rhythmic gymnastics, which was held in Moscow.

At the 2019 European Championships, she performed in qualifying with a hoop, ball and clubs and took gold medals in the finals with a ball and clubs, as well as gold in the team event. Having allowed a serious loss and taking a spare apparatus in qualification with a hoop, Arina could not qualify for the final of this type of exercise.

At the 2019 Russian Championship, Arina Averina for the first time in her sports career became the absolute champion of the country in the all-around final, showing all exercises at the highest level and receiving record marks in exercises with a ball of 24.000 and clubs of 24.200, as well as 23.300 for a hoop and 22.300 for a ribbon. On the sum of the four exercises, her score was 93.800. Her sister Dina finished second with a total of 89,400.  Following the results of the 2019 Russian Championship, Arina and Dina Averina earned tickets to the upcoming 2019 World Championship in Baku.

At the World championship 2019 In Baku, Arina won All-around Silver behind her Sister Dina. She also won Silver in the Ball Final and Team Gold. She shared the Team Gold with Dina Averina and Ekaterina Selezneva.

2020 
In 2020, at the first stage of the Grand Prix in Moscow, she withdrew from the competition due to injury. At the Russian Championship in February, she became the absolute champion in the individual standings. In the Estonian city of Tartu, at the second stage of the Grand Prix, Arina Averina became the absolute champion, having won four gold medals in exercises with a ribbon, ball, hoop and clubs. She also won the all-around.

The remaining 2020 competitive season was curtailed by the coronavirus pandemic. At the International Online Tournament "Match Meetings" 2020 she won gold in an exercise with a ball and silver in a hoop.

2021 
Averina participated in two 2021 World Cups prior to the Olympics, Tashkent and Pesaro. At the Tashkent World Cup Averina won gold in ball and clubs, but did not make the podium for all-around, ribbon and hoop. At the Pesaro World Cup, she won gold in ribbon and clubs, silver in all-around behind her twin, and bronze in hoop and ball. At the European Championships in June, Averina won all-around gold. Her final competition prior to the Olympics was supposed to be the Moscow World Challenge Cup in July, but she withdrew and Lala Kramarenko took her place.

In August at the 2020 Olympic Games in Tokyo, Averina qualified to the rhythmic gymnastics individual all-around final in second place, behind her twin by 0.125 points, and ahead of Israel's Linoy Ashram. In the all-around final, Averina scored 102.100 overall after a ribbon routine with obvious errors. Arina Averina finished fourth, behind champion Linoy Ashram, silver medalist Dina Averina, and bronze medalist Alina Harnasko. This was the first time since the 1996 Olympic Games that a Russian rhythmic gymnast did not win gold. After Russian allegations of judging bias in rhythmic gymnastics at the Olympics, FIG investigated and confirmed that the judging panels were fair and impartial.

In October, Averina competed at the World Championships in Kitakyushu, winning silver in ball behind her sister and finishing sixth with hoop.

Gymnastics technique 
Arina Averina is known for her pivot turns and clean apparatus handling. She can execute a quadruple ring pivot and a triple Kanaeva ring pivot. She also frequently adds penchee turns to her retinue of element skills.

Routine music information

Detailed Olympic results

Competitive highlights
(Team competitions in seniors are held only at the World Championships, Europeans and other Continental Games.)

See also
Dina Averina

References

External links

 
 Arina Averina  at r-gymnastics.com 
 
 
 
 Averina Twins unofficial fan page
 

1998 births
Living people
Sports controversies
Russian rhythmic gymnasts
People from Zavolzhye, Nizhny Novgorod Oblast
Medalists at the Rhythmic Gymnastics World Championships
Identical twins
Twin sportspeople
Russian twins
World Games gold medalists
World Games bronze medalists
Medalists at the Rhythmic Gymnastics European Championships
Gymnasts at the 2020 Summer Olympics
Sportspeople from Nizhny Novgorod Oblast